Baron HolmPatrick, of HolmPatrick in the County of Dublin, is a title in the Peerage of the United Kingdom. It was created in the 1897 Diamond Jubilee Honours for the Lord Lieutenant of County Dublin and former Member of Parliament for County Dublin, Ion Hamilton. Both his father, James Hans Hamilton, and grandfather, Hans Hamilton, had represented this constituency in the British Parliament.

 the title is held by the first Baron's great-grandson, the fourth Baron, who succeeded his father in 1991. He was active on the Labour benches in the House of Lords prior to the House of Lords Act 1999.

The family seat was Abbotstown House, near Castleknock, County Dublin.

Barons HolmPatrick (1897)
Ion Trant Hamilton, 1st Baron HolmPatrick (1839–1898)
Hans Wellesley Hamilton, 2nd Baron HolmPatrick  (1886–1942)
James Hans Hamilton, 3rd Baron HolmPatrick (1928–1991)
Hans James David Hamilton, 4th Baron HolmPatrick (b. 1955)

The heir presumptive is the present holder's brother, Hon. Ion Henry James Hamilton (b. 1956).
The heir presumptive's heir presumptive is his brother, Hon. Evelyn William James Hamilton (b. 1961).
The heir presumptive's heir presumptive's heir apparent is his only son, Ross Andrew James Hamilton (b. 1990).

References

Baronies in the Peerage of the United Kingdom
Noble titles created in 1897
Noble titles created for UK MPs
1897 establishments in the United Kingdom